Roberto Rosetti (born 18 September 1967) is an Italian former football referee. He is fluent in Italian (native), English and French. He started refereeing in 1983, and took charge of his first match in the Italian Serie A in 1996. He received his FIFA Badge in 2002. Aside from his refereeing duties, Rosetti works as director of a hospital.

Rosetti is counted amongst the top referees of all time in a list maintained by the International Federation of Football History and Statistics (IFFHS). He retired following the 2010 FIFA World Cup to take a position with the Italian Football Federation as the referee designator for Serie B League.

Luciano Moggi, then general director of Juventus, had described Rosetti and his colleague Pierluigi Collina as being too 'objective' in an intercepted telephone call. Moggi also claimed that Rosetti and Collina should be 'punished' for decisions made against Juventus in that same phonecall.

Career
Rosetti was born in Turin, Piedmont.

He was one of the many referees who officiated over the 2007–08 UEFA Champions League. He refereed the semi-final between Chelsea and Liverpool at Stamford Bridge.

Rosetti was selected to referee at UEFA Euro 2008 in Switzerland and Austria.

At the tournament, Rosetti was the referee for the:
 group A opening game between Switzerland and the Czech Republic;
 group D game between Greece and Russia;
 Quarter Final match between Croatia and Turkey
 Final match between Germany and Spain.
Rosetti was one of the many referees who officiated over the 2008–09 UEFA Champions League.

2010 World Cup
Rosetti was preselected as a referee for the 2010 FIFA World Cup. His first match of the tournament was a 1–1 draw between Ghana and Australia. Rosetti sent Australia's Harry Kewell off for handling the ball on the goal line, awarding Ghana a penalty kick. The next game he refereed was the Argentina–Mexico game in the Round of 16, which Argentina won 3–1; the match was surrounded by controversy, however, as Rosetti and his team of officials incorrectly allowed Carlos Tevez's opening goal to stand, even though replays later showed that it should have been ruled out for offside. Rosetti was later left off the list of 19 referees announced by FIFA to take part in the rest of the competition although football's world governing body did not explain why. This decision affected Rosetti greatly and was the major reason behind his immediate retirement following the tournament, although he denied that it was his error that led him to retire.

Honours
Serie A Referee of the Year: 2006, 2007, 2008, 2009
IFFHS World's Best Referee: 2008
Italian Football Hall of Fame: 2015

References

External links
FIFA profile
Profile on ratetheref.net

1967 births
Living people
Sportspeople from Turin
2006 FIFA World Cup referees
Italian football referees
2010 FIFA World Cup referees
FIFA World Cup referees
UEFA Euro 2008 referees
UEFA European Championship final referees